

Æthelweard was a medieval Bishop of Sherborne.

Æthelweard was consecrated around 909. He died around 909.

Citations

References

External links
 

Bishops of Sherborne (ancient)
10th-century English bishops